Boris Becker was the defending champion but did not compete that year.

Guy Forget won in the final 7–5, 6–4 against Cédric Pioline.

Seeds

  Yevgeny Kafelnikov (first round)
  Sergi Bruguera (quarterfinals)
  Daniel Vacek (second round)
  Jonas Björkman (first round)
  Bohdan Ulihrach (second round)
  Jakob Hlasek (second round)
  Cédric Pioline (final)
  Sjeng Schalken (second round)

Draw

Finals

Top half

Bottom half

External links
 Main Draw on ATP Archive

Open 13
1996 ATP Tour